Priscila Tommy (born 23 May 1991) is a ni-Vanuatu table tennis player.

She won gold in both the women's singles and team events at the 2007 South Pacific Games.

Tommy represented Vanuatu at the 2008 Summer Olympics in Beijing, and was her country's flag bearer at the opening ceremony. She faced Slovakia's Eva Odorova, ranked 762 places above her, in her opening game, and lost in straight sets.

Tommy was selected to represent Vanuatu at the 2010 Commonwealth Games in Delhi.

References

External links
 "Table Tennis-Olympian from the land of four tables" - an article about Tommy in Reuters, 16 August 2008
 Biography on the official website of the Beijing Olympics

External links
 

1991 births
Living people
Vanuatuan female table tennis players
Olympic table tennis players of Vanuatu
Table tennis players at the 2008 Summer Olympics
Table tennis players at the 2018 Commonwealth Games
Commonwealth Games competitors for Vanuatu